Lawrence General Hospital is private non-profit hospital with 189 beds in Lawrence, Massachusetts. It is affiliated with Tufts Children's Hospital and Beth Israel Deaconess Medical Center, a Harvard Medical School teaching hospital.

Facilities
Lawrence General Hospital provides many different areas of patient care including inpatient Medical Surgical, Maternity, Labor and Delivery, Telemetry, and Psychiatric, in addition to many outpatient services. There is new "41-bay Emergency Center, a new Imaging Center featuring the only "Ambient Imaging" technology in the State, a new, top-rated Cardiac Cath Lab, a new 4-suite Sleep Center, a new MITS Clinic, an expanded and fully renovated Pediatric Center in partnership with Floating Hospital for Children at Tufts Medical Center and an expanded Diabetes & Nutrition Education Center."

History
The hospital was founded in 1875 as the first hospital in the Merrimack Valley by the Ladies' Union Charitable Society, a private group of Christian women in Lawrence. The hospital was originally led by Dr. Susan Elizabeth Wood Crocker as the region's first free "invalid home" and was founded in response to a scarlet fever outbreak and also to provide medical care during the day for the sick children of working mothers in the mills. The Lawrence General School of Nursing was founded in 1882 and operated until 1977.  In 1899 the hospital moved from its earlier locations on Methuen Street and Montgomery Street to the donated estate of philanthropist, William A. Russell on Prospect Hill. In 1929 Philanthropist Harriet Nevins left a large bequest to the hospital. Large additions were made in 1941, 1958, 1963 1972, and in the 2000s.

Notable people
 Susan Elizabeth Wood Crocker

References

External links
Official website

Hospitals in Essex County, Massachusetts
Lawrence, Massachusetts
Organizations established in 1875
Hospitals established in 1875
Trauma centers